Brenthia gamicopis is a species of moth of the family Choreutidae. It is found in Uganda.

References

Endemic fauna of Uganda
Brenthia
Insects of Uganda
Moths of Africa
Moths described in 1930
Taxa named by Edward Meyrick